The  is a railway line of Kintetsu Corporation in Nara Prefecture, Japan connecting Shakudo Station in Katsuragi and Gose Station in Gose.

The line has four stations including the terminal Gose and the transfer station Shakudo. It is mainly used by commuters to Osaka, as well as those who access to Mt. Katsuragi. At Gose, there is a bus headed for the Mt. Katsuragi Ropeway, which is also run by Kintetsu.

Route data
 Gauge: 1,067 mm
 Length: 5.2 km
 Interlocking system: Electronic Interlocking

History
The Osaka Electric Railway Co. opened the line in 1930, electrified at 1500 VDC. The company merged with Kintetsu in 1944.

Stations

Connecting Lines
Minami Osaka Line at Shakudo
JR West Wakayama Line (Gose Station) at Gose

References
This article incorporates material from the corresponding article in the Japanese Wikipedia

Line map

Gose Line
Rail transport in Nara Prefecture
1067 mm gauge railways in Japan